Charles Luksa (born February 19, 1954) is a Canadian former ice hockey defenceman. He played 78 games in the World Hockey Association with the Cincinnati Stingers and 8 games in the National Hockey League with the Hartford Whalers between 1978 and 1980.

As a youth, Luksa played in the 1967 Quebec International Pee-Wee Hockey Tournament with a minor ice hockey team from Wexford, Toronto. Born in Toronto, Ontario, Luksa was drafted 172nd overall by the Montreal Canadiens in the 1974 NHL amateur draft and 177th overall by the Phoenix Roadrunners in the 1974 WHA Amateur Draft but never played for either team as Luska went on to spend four seasons in the American Hockey League for the Nova Scotia Voyageurs, winning the Calder Cup in successive years in 1977 and 1978. In 1978 the Roadrunners folded and Luksa signed with the Cincinnati Stingers as a free agent, playing 78 regular season games for the team, scoring 8 goals and twelve assists for 20 points. The WHA folded at the end of the season and Luksa was signed by the Hartford Whalers. Luksa would only play eight games for the Whalers, scoring one assist, as he spent much of the season in the AHL with the Springfield Indians and would later spend another full season in the league with the Binghamton Whalers.

Luksa moved to Finland's SM-liiga in 1981 and signed with Jokerit before returning to the AHL the same season and signed with the Rochester Americans before retiring from the sport.

Luksa subsequently began selling real estate in Newmarket, Ontario.

Career statistics

Regular season and playoffs

References

External links

1954 births
Living people
Binghamton Whalers players
Canadian expatriate ice hockey players in Finland
Canadian ice hockey defencemen
Cincinnati Stingers players
Hartford Whalers players
Jokerit players
Kitchener Rangers players
Montreal Canadiens draft picks
Nova Scotia Voyageurs players
Phoenix Roadrunners draft picks
Rochester Americans players
Ice hockey people from Toronto
Springfield Indians players